Santiago Mare (born 21 October 1996) is an Argentine rugby union player.he played for Italian team Mogliano in Top10. He made his debut appearance at the Olympics representing Argentina at the 2020 Summer Olympics.

Career 
He made his international rugby 7s debut for Argentina in 2017. He was selected in the national squad for the 2018 Rugby World Cup Sevens.  He was also named in Argentine rugby sevens squad for the 2018–19 World Rugby Sevens Series.

He was also named in Argentine squad to compete at the 2020 Summer Olympics in the men's rugby sevens tournament. He was also subsequently part of the Argentine side which claimed bronze medal after defeating Great Britain 17-12 in the third place match at the 2020 Summer Olympics. It was also the first ever Olympic medal for Argentina in rugby sevens.

References 

1996 births
Living people
Argentine rugby union players
Argentine rugby sevens players
Olympic rugby sevens players of Argentina
Rugby sevens players at the 2020 Summer Olympics
Pan American Games gold medalists for Argentina
Pan American Games medalists in rugby sevens
Rugby sevens players at the 2019 Pan American Games
Medalists at the 2019 Pan American Games
Olympic bronze medalists for Argentina
Olympic medalists in rugby sevens
Medalists at the 2020 Summer Olympics
Rugby union players from Buenos Aires
Rugby union fly-halves
Jaguares (Super Rugby) players